Pallavi is an Indian actress. in Tamil and Kannada films from 1985 to 1993 and continued to pursue her career as a supporting actor.

She has acted alongside various lead actors including Rajinikanth, Kamal Haasan, Ambareesh, Vijayakanth, Prabhu, Karthik, Murali, S. Ve. Shekher, Mohan, Arjun, Mukesh, Suresh Gopi, Pandiarajan and Shankar Nag. She was first introduced in Telugu by A. Kodandarami Reddy in the flim, Illalu Priyuralu in 1984.Afterwards, she was introduced in Kannada by T.S.Nagabharana in the film, Nethra Pallavi in 1985 and then she was introduced in Tamil by legendary actor, Sivaji Ganesan in his home production, Aruvadai Naal starring his son, Prabhu in 1986. Afterwards, she starred in many films as a glamorous and modern heroine

Filmography

Television

References 

Living people
Actresses in Kannada cinema
Indian film actresses
Actresses in Tamil cinema
20th-century Indian actresses
21st-century Indian actresses
1965 births
Actresses in Tamil television
Actresses in Malayalam cinema
Actresses in Telugu cinema
Actresses in Hindi cinema